Coxinha (little [chicken] thigh) is a popular food in Brazil consisting of chopped or shredded chicken meat, covered in dough, molded into a shape resembling a teardrop, battered and fried.

History
Coxinhas were originally made with any part of the chicken, and its traditional shape is meant to resemble a drumstick. In its modern processed form, it may have originated in Limeira in the 19th century.

In the book Stories & Recipes, Nadir Cavazin says that the son of Isabel, Princess Imperial of Brazil (1846-1921) and Prince Gaston, Count of Eu, a child who lived in seclusion for having mental problems, had a favorite dish, chicken, but only ate the drumstick. One day, not having enough drumsticks, the cook decided to turn a whole chicken into drumsticks, shredding it and making the filling for a flour dough shaped into a drumstick. The child endorsed the results. Empress Teresa Cristina, when she was visiting him, could not resist the tasty delicacy; she liked it so much she requested that the master of the imperial kitchen learn how to prepare the snack.

Preparation

The coxinha is based on dough made with wheat flour and chicken broth and optionally mashed potato, which is filled with shredded spiced chicken meat, or a whole chicken drumstick. The filling consists of chicken, catupiry cheese or requeijão  and onions, parsley and scallions, and occasionally tomato sauce, turmeric. The coxinha is coated in batter, then in bread crumbs or manioc flour and deep fried. It is shaped to roughly resemble a chicken drumstick. The dough used to coat the filling is generally prepared with the broth of the chicken, enhancing the flavor of the coating.

Variations
Different variations of the original are becoming more prevalent today – for example, the coxinha mineira, for which the filling includes maize, so named because maize is deemed a culinary tradition in the state of Minas Gerais, as well as areas where the caipira and sertanejo dialects are spoken. Cheese coxinhas are also very common in snack bars. In Curitiba, chicken coxinhas filled with cheddar and Araucaria nuts can be found in local restaurants. To mark the cheese they usually have a toothpick where the bone would be in a chicken coxinha.

Other unconventional ingredients, generally used for home-made coxinhas made by aficionados, include peas, chopped button mushrooms, palmheart, carrot, cooked and seasoned cashew apples, unripe jackfruit or unripe breadfruit, as well as whole-wheat flour batter or even a vegetarian version of either textured vegetable protein (soy meat) or falafel with appropriate seasonings so its taste resembles a traditional coxinha more closely. These variants are rarely found in snack bars.

Related foods
Coxinha literally means "little thigh", and it is how deep fried chicken legs are informally named in Brazil (coxa frita means a deep fried chicken leg, while sobrecoxa frita stands for a deep fried upper drumstick; It is not uncommon for people having a strong preference for certain poultry cuts over others). Battered and deep fried chicken breast pieces, for example, are generally called by a name of English influence, nugget.

Political term 
Starting in São Paulo, the word "" has been used as an insult, now referring loosely to people who display a lavish but dull lifestyle, hold conservative political opinions and also police officers.

See also
Croquette
Arancini
Cuisine of Brazil
List of Brazilian dishes

References

External links
 Coxinha recipe at SouthAmericanFood.about

Brazilian cuisine
Snack foods
Street food
Chicken dishes
Deep fried foods
Stuffed dishes